This is a list of Belgian television related events from 1978.

Events
8 February - Jean Vallée is selected to represent Belgium at the 1978 Eurovision Song Contest with his song "L'amour ça fait chanter la vie". He is selected to be the twenty-third Belgian Eurovision entry during Eurosong.

Debuts

Television shows

Ending this year

Births
3 May - Anneke van Hooff, actress & singer
26 May - Elke Vanelderen, TV host
7 June - Mathias Coppens, actor
10 June - Gerrit De Cock, TV host
13 August - Tiany Kiriloff, TV host
24 October - Christophe Haddad, actor
9 November - Evi Hanssen, singer & TV host

Deaths